Advantage (translit. Avantazh) is a 1977 Bulgarian drama film directed by Georgi Djulgerov. It was entered into the 28th Berlin International Film Festival, where Djulgerov won the Silver Bear for Best Director.

Cast
 Rousy Chanev - Petela
 Plamen Donchev - Gerchev
 Maria Statoulova - Roumiana
 Plamena Getova - Gela
 Radosveta Vassileva - Uchitelkata
 Dimitr Ganev - Lyubo
 Veljo Goranov - Palikamara
 Diana Chelebieva - Keranka
 Stefan Popov - Zordan
 Mariana Krumova - Kradlata na znameto
 Valcho Kamarashev - Mazhat na Rumiana
 Evtim Kirilov - Starshinata Dryanski
 Kliment Mihaylov - Sluzhitel ot grazhdanckoto otdelenie
 Iskra Yossiffova - Stazhantka
 Krikor Hugasjan - Chichoto na Rumyana

References

External links

1977 films
1977 drama films
1970s Bulgarian-language films
Films directed by Georgi Djulgerov
Films shot in Bulgaria
Bulgarian drama films